Diego Álvarez de Osorio (1485 – May 1536) was a Roman Catholic prelate who served as the first Bishop of Nicaragua (1531–1536).

Biography
Records indicate that Diego Álvarez de Osorio was born in Darien, Panama in 1485; although this is believed unlikely. Other sources indicate that he arrived in Panama in 1528 where he served as canon of the cathedral. On 26 Feb 1531, he was appointed during the papacy of Pope Clement VII as Bishop of Nicaragua. Although he was never consecrated bishop, he served as Bishop Elect of Nicaragua until his death in May 1536.

References

External links and additional sources
 (for Chronology of Bishops) 
 (for Chronology of Bishops) 

16th-century Roman Catholic bishops in Nicaragua
1485 births
1536 deaths
Bishops appointed by Pope Clement VII
Roman Catholic bishops of León in Nicaragua